Gary Stephen Katzmann (born April 22, 1953) is a United States Judge of the United States Court of International Trade and former Massachusetts judge.

Biography

Katzmann received an Artium Baccalaureus degree in 1973 from Columbia College at Columbia University. He received a Master of Letters in 1976 from the University of Oxford. He received a Master of Public Policy in 1979 from the Yale School of Organization and Management. He received a Juris Doctor in 1979 from Yale Law School. He began his legal career by serving as a law clerk to Judge Leonard B. Sand of the United States District Court for the Southern District of New York from 1979 to 1980 and to Judge Stephen Breyer of the United States Court of Appeals for the First Circuit from 1980 to 1981. From 1981 to 1983, he worked at Harvard Law School's Center for Criminal Justice as a research associate and special investigator. From 1983 to 2004, he served in the United States Attorney's Office for the District of Massachusetts, including as chief appellate attorney, deputy chief of the criminal division, and chief legal counsel to the United States Attorney.  While at the United States Attorney's Office, he was detailed to the Federal Bureau of Investigation from 1994 to 1995 and the Office of the Deputy Attorney General from 1993 to 1994. From 2004 to 2016, he served as an associate justice of the Massachusetts Appeals Court adjudicating civil and criminal matters. His twin brother, Robert Katzmann, served as a senior United States Circuit Judge on the United States Court of Appeals for the Second Circuit.

Trade Court service

On July 30, 2015, President Barack Obama nominated Katzmann to serve as a United States Judge of the United States Court of International Trade, to the seat vacated by Judge Jane A. Restani, who took senior status on March 1, 2015. He received a hearing on his nomination on January 27, 2016. On April 7, 2016, his nomination was reported out of committee by voice vote. On June 6, 2016, the U.S. Senate confirmed Katzmann's nomination in a voice vote. He received his commission on September 15, 2016.

References

Sources
FJC Bio

1953 births
Living people
Alumni of the University of Oxford
Columbia College (New York) alumni
Judges of the United States Court of International Trade
Massachusetts lawyers
Massachusetts state court judges
Lawyers from New York City
Yale Law School alumni
Yale School of Management alumni
21st-century American judges
American twins
Assistant United States Attorneys
United States federal judges appointed by Barack Obama